Robert Evans (1930–2019) was an American film producer.

Robert, Rob, Bob or Bobby Evans may also refer to:

Business
Robert Harding Evans (1778–1857), bookseller and auctioneer
Robert B. Evans (1906–1998), industrialist, socialite, sportsman, and Chairman of AMC
Robert Evans (businessman) (1927–2020), British businessman, CEO and chairman of British Gas plc
Bob Evans (restaurateur) (1918–2007), restaurateur and founder of Bob Evans Restaurants

Education
Robert F. Evans (died 1974), classical scholar
Charles Evans (mountaineer) (Robert Charles Evans, 1918–1995), British mountaineer, surgeon, and educator
R. J. W. Evans (Robert John Weston Evans, born 1943), professor of modern history

Entertainment
Rob Evans (Christian musician) (born 1953), children's singer-songwriter known as the Donut Man
Robert Evans (writer) (born 1976), playwright and actor
 Bob Evans, the stage name of Kevin Mitchell (musician) (born 1977)
Rob Evans (writer) (born 1978), playwright
Sutter Kain or Robert Evans (born 1983/84), rapper
Robert Evans (journalist), former humor columnist for Cracked.com, journalist, and podcaster
Rob Evans (born 1988), model and judge on America's Next Top Model

Politics
Robert Morgan Evans (1783–1844), American politician in Indiana
Robert E. Evans (1856–1925), Nebraska Republican politician
Robert Evans (Mississippi politician) (born 1950), member of the Mississippi House of Representatives
Robert Evans (British politician) (born 1956), Member of the European Parliament for the Labour and Co-operative Parties
Robert William Evans (1862–1955), Australian politician, businessman and music advocate

Science and technology
Bob O. Evans (1927–2004), computer pioneer and corporate executive
Robert Evans (astronomer) (1937–2022), amateur supernovae astronomer

Sports

Football
Robert Evans (footballer, born 1885) (1885–1965), footballer who played for Sheffield United
Bob Evans (coach) (Melbourne C. Evans, 1889–1964), 1910s-era American university sports coach
Bob Evans (footballer) (Robert Owen Evans, 1881–1962), 1900s-era Welsh goalkeeper
Robert Spencer Evans (1911–1981), 1930s-era English footballer
Bobby Evans (footballer) (1927–2001), Scottish footballer who played for Celtic and Chelsea F.C.
Robert Evans (Australian footballer) (born 1960), former Australian rules footballer
Rob Evans (footballer) (born 1995), Welsh footballer playing for Wrexham AFC
Robert Evans (English footballer), English amateur football right back

Other sports
Robert Evans (racing driver) (1889–?), American racecar driver
Robert Evans (cricketer) (1899–1981), English cricketer and educator
Bob Evans (baseball) (1910–1947), American Negro leagues baseball player
Bob Evans (basketball) (1925–1997), American professional basketball player
Robert Evans (referee) (1939–2016), Welsh-American international soccer referee, author, and geologist
Rob Evans (basketball) (born 1944), American college basketball coach and former college player
Bob Evans (racing driver) (born 1947), British Formula One driver 
Bobby Evans (defensive back) (born 1967), Canadian football player
Bobby Evans (baseball) (born 1969), general manager of the San Francisco Giants
Bob Evans (wrestler) (born 1972), American professional wrestler and trainer
Robert Evans (wrestler) (born 1983), Canadian professional wrestler
Bob Evans (rugby union) (1921–2003), Wales international rugby union player
Rob Evans (rugby union) (born 1992), Welsh rugby union player
Bobby Evans (offensive lineman) (born 1997), American football player

Other people
Robert Evans (Master of Magdalene) (died 1570), Welsh priest and academic
Robert Evans (Archdeacon of Westmorland) (1789–1866), English Anglican archdeacon and author
Robert Evans (Archdeacon of Cloyne) (1808–1889), Irish Anglican archdeacon
Robert Anderson Evans (died 1901), English executioner
Robert Evans JP (1832–1911), architect from Nottingham
Robley D. Evans (admiral) (1846–1912), American naval fleet commander
Robert K. Evans (1852–1926), United States Army officer
Robert Evans (Jun) (1863–1927), English architect based in Nottingham
Terry Peder Rasmussen (1943–2010) or Robert "Bob" Evans, suspected serial killer
Robert C. Evans (born 1947), American prelate of the Roman Catholic Church
Robert Evans (photographer) (born 1967), American photographer
Rob Evans (reporter), investigative reporter
Robert G. Evans, Canadian economist

See also
Bert Evans (disambiguation)
Bob Evans Restaurants, a chain of American restaurants